Frohnau is a locality in the Reinickendorf borough of Berlin, Germany. It lies in the extreme northern part of the city. Frohnau is an affluent area characterized by many patrician villas from the early 20th century. During the Cold War, it was part of West Berlin.

History
Founded in 1910, Frohnau was created whole as a planned community, corresponding to the early twentieth-century idea of a garden city. Frohnau was founded in the Stolper Heath, which had been bought for the Berlin Terrain Commission by Count Guido Henckel von Donnersmarck in 1907. The competition for the design was won by a plan developed by Joseph Brix and Felix Genzmer. Their concept represented an asymmetrical, seemingly natural development out of the dunes near the Havel River. Even the name "Frohnau" was determined by a contest. In 1920, Frohnau was annexed into the Greater Berlin city-state.

Architectures

The natural center of the city has always been the train station and the nearby buildings. The casino tower serves as the symbol of Frohnau. The entire area is noted for its large mansion-like buildings.

The architects responsible for the typical mansions include Walter and Johannes Krüger (the Church of St. John), Hart and Lesser (train station and casino tower), Max Meyer (Buddhist house), Paul Poser, Max Scheidling, and Heinrich Straumer (better known for his work on Berlin's radio tower, Funkturm).

Frohnau includes one of the tallest buildings in Germany: The Richtfunkmast (microwave radio tower) measures 358.6 m (1177 ft) in height and was built between 1977–1979. Until German reunification, this was the means for keeping microwave radio contact with West Germany. The receiving tower on the West German side was in Gartow, Lower Saxony. Alongside the Richtfunkmast is a 117 m (384 ft) free-standing steel framework tower, which is dwarfed in comparison. This was built between 1970 and 1973, and had 18 m (66 ft) diameter parabolic antennae to enable radio connection beyond the horizon to Lower Saxony until 1995. Since 2002 mediumwave digital radio transmissions have been tested in Frohnau at 1485 kHz. Since neither the Richtfunkmast nor the parabolic antenna tower was intended for mediumwave transmissions, an additional 10 m (33 ft) long-wire antenna was installed.

References

External links

 Frohnau page of Reinickendorfer site

Localities of Berlin

Populated places established in 1910